Qabaqtəpə (also, Kabagtepe, Kabakhtapa, and Kabakhtepe) is a village and municipality in the Dashkasan Rayon of Azerbaijan.  It has 788 people living in it. There are three villages in the municipality: Qabaqtp, Gəlinqaya, and Rəsullu.

References 

Populated places in Dashkasan District